Antiplanes is a genus of sea snails, marine gastropod mollusks in the family Pseudomelatomidae,.

Description
(Original description) These deep-water and abyssal forms are smooth except for incremental lines and sometimes fine spiral striae. The periostracum is conspicuous and the shell disposed to be chalky. The anal sulcus is shallow and more or less rounded, usually situated some distance from the suture, but not quite on the periphery of the whorl. The siphonal canal is rather wide and long and often a little recurved. The aperture is unarmed. There are both dextral and sinistral species.

Species
Species within the genus Antiplanes include:
 Antiplanes abarbarea Dall, 1919
 Antiplanes abyssalis Kantor & Sysoev, 1991
 Antiplanes amphitrite Dall, 1919
 Antiplanes antigone (Dall, 1919)
 Antiplanes briseis Dall, 1919
 Antiplanes bulimoides Dall, 1919
 Antiplanes catalinae (Raymond, 1904)
 Antiplanes delicatus Okutani & Iwahori, 1992:
 Antiplanes dendritoplicata Kantor & Sysoev, 1991
 Antiplanes diomedea Bartsch, 1944
 Antiplanes habei Kantor & Sysoev, 1991
 Antiplanes isaotakii (Habe, 1958)
 Antiplanes kurilensis Kantor & Sysoev, 1991
 Antiplanes litus Dall, 1919
 Antiplanes motojimai (Habe, 1958)
 Antiplanes obesus Ozaki, 1958 
 Antiplanes obliquiplicata Kantor & Sysoev, 1991
 Antiplanes profundicola Bartsch, 1944
 Antiplanes sanctiioannis (Smith E. A., 1875)
 Antiplanes spirinae Kantor & Sysoev, 1991
 Antiplanes thalaea (Dall, 1902)
 Antiplanes vinosa (Dall, 1874)
 † Antiplanes voyi (Gabb, 1866) 
 Antiplanes yukiae (Shikama, 1962)
Species brought into synonymy
 Antiplanes agamedea Dall, 1919: synonym of Spirotropis agamedea (Dall, 1919)
 Antiplanes amycus Dall, 1919: synonym of Leucosyrinx kantori McLean, 1995
 Antiplanes beringi (Aurivillius, 1885): synonym of Antiplanes sanctiioannis (Smith E. A., 1875)
 Antiplanes catalinae contraria Yokoyama, 1926: synonym of Antiplanes vinosa (Dall, 1874)
 Antiplanes contraria (Yokoyama, 1926): synonym of Antiplanes vinosa (Dall, 1874)
 Antiplanes diaulax (Dall, 1908): synonym of Rhodopetoma diaulax (Dall, 1908) 
 Antiplanes diomedia [sic]: synonym of Antiplanes diomedea Bartsch, 1944
 Antiplanes gabbi Kantor & Sysoev, 1991: synonym of Antiplanes catalinae (Raymond, 1904)
 Antiplanes hyperia Dall, 1919: synonym of Pseudotaranis hyperia (Dall, 1919)
 Antiplanes kamchatica Dall, 1919: synonym of Antiplanes vinosa (Dall, 1874)
 Antiplanes kawamurai (Habe, 1958): synonym of Antiplanes obesus Ozaki, 1958
 Antiplanes major Bartsch, 1944: synonym of Antiplanes catalinae (Raymond, 1904)
 Antiplanes perversus (Gabb, 1865): synonym of Antiplanes catalinae (Raymond, 1904)
 Antiplanes piona Dall, 1902: synonym of Antiplanes sanctiioannis (Smith, 1875)
 Antiplanes rotula Dall, 1921: synonym of Antiplanes thalaea (Dall, 1902)
 Antiplanes sadoensis Yokoyama, 1926: synonym of Antiplanes sanctiioannis (Smith, 1875)
 Antiplanes santarosana (Dall, 1902): synonym of Antiplanes thalaea (Dall, 1902)
 Antiplanes voyi sensu Abbott, 1974: synonym of Antiplanes catalinae (Raymond, 1904)
 Antiplanes willetti Berry, 1953: synonym of Antiplanes thalaea (Dall, 1902)
 Antiplanes yessoensis Dall, 1925: synonym of Antiplanes sanctiioannis (Smith E. A., 1875)

References

 McLean J.H. (1996). The Prosobranchia. In: Taxonomic Atlas of the Benthic Fauna of the Santa Maria Basin and Western Santa Barbara Channel. The Mollusca Part 2 – The Gastropoda. Santa Barbara Museum of Natural History. volume 9: 1-160
 Shikama T. (1977). Descriptions of new and noteworthy Gastropoda from western Pacific and Indian Oceans. Science Reports of the Yokohama National University, section II (Geology). 24: 1-23, 5 pls

External links
  Bartsch, P, Some turrid mollusks of Monterey Bay and vicinity; Proceedings of the Biological Society of Washington, v. 57 p. 57-68
 
 Bouchet, P.; Kantor, Y. I.; Sysoev, A.; Puillandre, N. (2011). A new operational classification of the Conoidea (Gastropoda). Journal of Molluscan Studies. 77(3): 273-308

 
Pseudomelatomidae
Gastropod genera